Gagarinsky (masculine), Gagarinskaya (feminine), or Gagarinskoye (neuter) is the name of several rural localities in Russia:
Gagarinsky (rural locality), a settlement in Bogdanovsky Selsoviet of Uritsky District of Oryol Oblast
Gagarinskoye, a village in Berezyatsky Selsoviet of Tonshayevsky District of Nizhny Novgorod Oblast